Kekunagolla National School is a famous Muslim school in Kurunegala District, North Western Province Sri Lanka. The birth of the college was a result of the educational reform that was brought along with the 1920 political reforms. It was established in 1925.

National schools in Sri Lanka
Schools in Kurunegala District